Ashfield Brick Pits is a 0.6 hectare (1.4 acre) geological site of Special Scientific Interest south of Conisbrough in South Yorkshire. The site was notified in 1955.

See also
List of Sites of Special Scientific Interest in South Yorkshire

References
 Ashfield Brick Pits Natural England. Retrieved on 2009-02-12

Sites of Special Scientific Interest notified in 1955
Sites of Special Scientific Interest in South Yorkshire